Kingston Transit operates the transit service in Kingston, Ontario, Canada as well as to the neighbouring community of Amherstview, in Loyalist Township. Major transfer points are at the Kingston Centre, Downtown Kingston (at the corner of Bagot and Brock streets), Cataraqui Town Centre, and Gardiners Town Centre.

Kingston Transit offers service to all three schools of higher education in the region: Queen's University, St. Lawrence College, and RMC. It also offers service to the Kingston Bus Terminal and the railway station.

History 
The Kingston Public Transit System began service on July 1, 1962, when the city's Public Utilities Commission took over the operation of transit service from Kingston City Coach, a subsidiary of Colonial Coach Lines. The Kingston Transit name was adopted in 1975.

In 2017, Kingston Transit experienced a record six million rides, which was the fourth consecutive year that ridership grew by more than 10 percent.

Routes

Local 
Local routes operate Monday–Saturday from approximately 6:00 am to 11:00 pm and Sunday from 8:30 am to 8:30 pm. They run every 30 minutes Monday–Saturday before 7:00 pm, and every 60 minutes at all other times unless otherwise noted.

Seasonal 
Seasonal routes primarily serve Queen's University and only operate from September–April (excluding the period between last exam day in December and first day of classes in January, and Reading Week).

Express 
Express routes operate with a frequency of 10–30 minutes and have stops placed further apart than local routes.

Dial-A-Bus

Fares

Kingston Transit fares and My Card rates effective January 1, 2017. Daily and Weekly passes are also available from various transit locations.

Kingston Transit employs a smart card payment system for monthly passes (My Pass) and tickets (My Tickets), which was introduced in August 2008.

Transfers are free for cash fares but must be obtained at the time fare is paid. They are valid for 60 minutes. Payments using My Tickets have transfers automatically stored inside the card.

Queen's University students, who are members of the AMS or SGPS, as well as St. Lawrence College students can ride free, as part of a U-Pass program.

Rack and Roll
The current "Rack and Roll" system is used for bicycle transportation. If a customer wishes to bring a bicycle onto the bus, a pull-down rack is located at the outside front of the bus. The rack can currently hold 2 bicycles.  It involves 2 slots which the bicycle's wheels fit into.  Then, a curved hook fits around the front tire to secure the bike from falling.  Rack and Roll is available during the cycling season.

References

External links

 Kingston Transit Official Website
 Drawings and photos of Kingston Transit buses
 CPTDB

Transit agencies in Ontario
Transport in Kingston, Ontario